Akoka County is an administrative area in Upper Nile State, South Sudan.

References

Counties of South Sudan